Obuasi Airport is a private airport serving the town of Obuasi in Obuasi Municipal District of the Ashanti Region of Ghana.

History

Obuasi Airport is a private airfield developed by Anglo Gold Ashanti to service their operations at the Obuasi Gold Mine. The airport was developed from a former airstrip and was inaugurated on 30 August 2012 by Minister of Transport, Collins Dauda. The airport is operated by Gianair on behalf of the owners.

Destinations

Accidents and Incidents

 On 19 March 2003, a Beech 1900D operated by Ashanti Goldfields Corporation with 4 passengers and 2 crew overran the runway after aborting take-off at a speed of 80 knots. The aircraft came to rest in rocky ground near the runway and sustained substantial damage. No fatalities were reported.

References

Airports in Ghana